Dieshan is a former district of the city of Wuzhou, Guangxi, China. In early 2013 it was merged into Wanxiu District.

References

County-level divisions of Guangxi